Michael Charles (born 23 February 1956) is an Australian born blues musician, songwriter, guitarist, and singer. He is an inductee into the Chicago Blues Hall of Fame.

Early life and education
Charles was born in Australia. His father was a music hobbyist and taught his son his first chords. At nine years old Michael formed a band and put on his first live paid performance. In 1970 he traveled with older musicians performing shows, corporate gigs, and weddings.

Career
In 1972, Charles formed the band Black Venom. They performed live on television. In the early 1980s Charles joined the band Magnum and they released "Bring Back Your Love” – “Coming Back Home”.

In 1983, Charles released his first solo recording “I’m A Puppet”. In 1984 he met record producer Greg Williams of Dex Audio of Australia and Charles produced several releases. Charles performs on Dex Audio's record label Newmarket Music in Australia. Greg Williams continues to produce and master Charles’ recordings.

In 1985, Charles formed an independent record label, Moonlight Label. From 1986 through 1989 Charles and Salik Silverstein of SOS Silver Spoon Productions produced three videos which aired on Australia’s Night Shift, Rage, and MTV. In 1987 and 1988 he traveled about Australia on a promotional tour.

In 1990, Charles traveled to the USA to perform at Buddy Guy's Legends in Chicago, Illinois. From 1990 to 1995 he traveled several times to America, performing with Buddy Guy, Eddy Clearwater, George Baze, Junior Wells, James Cotton, Phil Guy. In 1991 Jerry Bryant of JBTV in Chicago Illinois featured Charles on JBTV's blues show, Blues Oasis. In 1993 he released his first solo album. (In late of 2006 Jerry Bryant of JBTV and Michael reunited to start a DVD project which continued on into 2007).

In 1995, Charles toured with blues musician Jimmy Dawkins, and was signed by producer Jack Mehl to his record label, Moonlight Records; a year later Moonlight released "My Shadow", Michael’s first CD in the USA. Charles joined NARAS, the Grammy Award Association where he also entertained monthly for two years at the Chicago Chapter.  In 2005 he was the recipient of an award from the Grammy Award Association and NARAS commemorating his ten year anniversary.

In 1996, Charles built a recording studio in America. In 1997 he performed at the Crossroads Festival in Memphis Tennessee as the guest of Sam Phillips.  Beginning in 1990, Charles appeared on DJ John Gorny's Blue Midnight show on WPNA radio, Chicago, Illinois many times through the years. In 1997 Charles appeared for the first of six appearances on WGN-TV. He built a second recording studio in America.

During the next ten years Michael performances included the Chicago Blues Festival, New Orleans Jazz and Blues Festival, Philadelphia Blues Fest, Memphis Tennessee Crossroads Conference, New Orleans Cutting Edge Conference. In 1999 Michael moved to Nashville for 18 months and was featured in Nashville's "Rock and Read". In 2000 Michael Charles moved back to Chicago and built a third recording studio. His fourth and latest studio was built in 2003 and was called Sammary Studio.

Charles traveled around North America on a number of musical tours. He gave each a name, including the Full Circle tour in 2008, the Another Time Another Place Tour in 2010, the Connected tour in 2011, the Road Dawg tour in 2012, the Undercover Tour in 2013, the Three Hundred Sixty Tour in 2014 (including a performance at the Chicago BluesFest), and the RIFF Tour in 2015.

In October 2015, Michael Charles was inducted into Chicago Blues Hall of Fame. At that time he had recorded about 34 albums of blues rock music.

In 2018 as Charles travelled his from A to Z tour, Salik Silverstein, movie and film producer from Australia, released the documentary on the life and musical career of Michael Charles, All I Really Know from A to Z. The DVD was released in 2019.  "Soundtracked", the CD soundtrack to the documentary was also released in 2019.  In 2020 Moonlight Label released “The Early Years" , a CD of the complete 45 r.p.m. singles released 1984-1988 by Michael Charles in Australia before he moved to the U.S.A. in 1990.  Also, in 2020 “19”,  the downloadable album of all the Alone and Acoustic songs recorded during the pandemic became available. In 2021 a 2 CD and 1 DVD Box set chronologizing the entire pandemic experience from the recording studio was released making the total of Charles' releases thirty-eight.

After the pandemic of 2020 MC continues to tour internationally with his band in 2021.

Discography

Singles
"I'm A Puppet" 1983 Quasi Productions 45rpm
"Time Just Keeps Calling" 1986 Moonlight Label 45rpm
"Imaginations And Mind Games" 1987 Moonlight Label 45rpm
"Long Way To Go"  1987 Moonlight Label 45rpm
"She's My Woman"  1987 Moonlight Label 45rpm
"Without Your Love (For Company)" 1986 Moonlight Label 45rpm 12 inch
"Crawling on the Floor" 1996  Moonlight Label CD
"Simple Day" Living 2000  Moonlight Label  CD
"Simple Day" Living Limited Edition 2000  CD
"MC Shuffle" 2002 Moonlight Label  CD
"Come’ Melodia" 2002 Moonlight Label  CD
"Connected (For the Radio)" 2010  Moonlight Label  CD
"After Midnight" 2011  Moonlight Label / Newmarket Music  CD
"Going Down" 2012    Moonlight Label / Newmarket Music CD
"Crosscut Saw" 2013   Moonlight Label / Newmarket Music  CD
"Hey Joe"  2013  Moonlight Label / Newmarket Music  CD
"Cover Tunes" 2013  MoonlightLabel /Newmarket Music  CD
"Why Am I Here?" 2015  Moonlight Label   CD
"Long Way To Go" [Live] 2015 Moonlight Label Download
"Coming Back Home" 2016 Moonlight Label  Download
"All I Really Know" 2018 Moonlight Label Download
"Key To The Highway" 2021 Moonlight Label Download

Albums
Try Another Key YPRX2237 1985 Quasi Productions Vinyl
Home Through The Streets 1986 Moonlight Label Vinyl, Cassette, 2008 CD
The Wind 1989 Moonlight Label  Vinyl, cassette, 1998 CD
My Shadow  1996 Moonlight Records cassette, CD
Hard Days & Long Nights  1990 Moonlight Label   CD
Keep Walking  1999 Moonlight Label CD
Recall MLL-008 2004 Moonlight Label  CD
I’m Nobody’s Fool  2006 Moonlight Label  2008 Newmarket Music  
Connected  2010 MLL-010 Moonlight Label CD
Michael Charles  Three Hundred Sixty 2014  CD
Concert at the Nest  2015 Moonlight Label CD
Sandstone  2017 Moonlight Label CD
Sondtracked 2019 Moonlight Label CD
The Early Years 2020 Moonlight Label CD
19  2020 Moonlight Label Download 
19+  2021 Moonlight Label CD / DVD Box set

DVD
 Michael Charles Live at JBTV Live TV 2006-2007 DVD
 All I Really Know 2018'' DVD

References

External links
Official website

1956 births
Living people
Australian blues singers
Australian blues guitarists